Inishmore (or  ) is the largest of the Aran Islands in Galway Bay, off the west coast of Ireland.

The island is in the Irish-speaking Gaeltacht and has a strong Irish culture. Much of the island is karst landscape and it has a wealth of ancient and medieval sites including Dún Aonghasa, described as "the most magnificent barbaric monument in Europe" by George Petrie.

Name
Before the 20th century, the island was usually called Árainn or Árainn Mhór, which is thought to mean "kidney-shaped" or "ridge". It was anglicized as 'Aran', 'Aran More' or 'Great Aran'. This has caused some confusion with Arranmore, County Donegal, which has the same Irish name. The name 'Inishmore' was "apparently concocted by the Ordnance Survey for its map of 1839" as an anglicization of Inis Mór ("big island"), as there is no evidence of its use before then.

Because the island is in the Gaeltacht, Árainn is the only legal placename in Irish or English as declared in the Official Languages Act 2003.

Geology and geography 
The island is an extension of the Burren.  The terrain of the island is composed of limestone pavements with crisscrossing cracks known as "grikes", leaving isolated rocks called "clints".
The limestones date from the Visean period (Lower Carboniferous), formed as sediments in a tropical sea approximately 350 million years ago, and compressed into horizontal strata with fossil corals, crinoids, sea urchins and ammonites. Glaciation following the Namurian phase facilitated greater denudation.

The result is that Inis Mór and the other islands are among the finer examples of Glacio-Karst landscape in the world. The effects of the last glacial period (the Midlandian) are most in evidence, with the island overrun by ice during this glaciation. The impact of earlier Karstification (solutional erosion) has been eliminated by the last glacial period. So any Karstification now seen dates from approximately 10,000 years ago and the island Karst is thus recent.

Solutional processes have widened and deepened the grikes of the limestone pavement. Pre-existing lines of weakness in the rock (vertical joints) contribute to the formation of extensive fissures separated by clints (flat pavement like slabs). The rock karstification facilitates the formation of subterranean drainage.

Towns and villages
Cill Rónáin (Kilronan)
Eochaill (Oghill)
Mainistir (Manister)
Cill Mhuirbhigh (Kilmurvy)
Iarairne (Eararna)
Cill Éinne (Killeany)
Gort na gCapall 
Fearann an Choirce (Oatquarter)
Corrúch
Creig an Chéirín 
Bungabhla
Baile na Creige
Sruthán
Eoghanacht (Onaght)

Flora and fauna
The island supports arctic, Mediterranean and alpine plants side by side, due to the unusual environment. Like the Burren, the Aran islands are known for their unusual assemblage of plants and animals.
The grikes (crevices) provide moist shelter, thus supporting a wide range of plants including dwarf shrubs. Where the surface of the pavement is shattered into gravel, many of the hardier Arctic or alpine plants can be found.

But when the limestone pavement is covered by a thin layer of soil, patches of grass are seen, interspersed with plants like the gentian and orchids.
Insects present include the butterfly the pearl-bordered fritillary (Boloria euphrosyne), brown hairstreak (Thecla betulae), marsh fritillary (Euphydryas aurinia) and wood white (Leptidea sinapis); the moths, the burren green (Calamia tridens), Irish annulet (Gnophos dumetata) and transparent burnet (Zygaena purpuralis); and the hoverfly Doros profuges.

Tourism

Inis Mór today is a major tourist destination, with bed and breakfast accommodation scattered across the island. Private minibuses, horse-drawn carriages and bicycles are the main methods of getting about for the numerous tourists who visit the island in the summer months.

There is a small museum illustrating the history of Dún Aonghasa and its possible functions, while the Aran Sweater Market is a focal point for visitors who can trace the culture and history associated with the Aran sweater through the on-site museum. Nearby are a Neolithic tomb and a small heritage park at Dún Eochla, featuring examples of a traditional thatched cottage and poteen distillery.
The Tempull Breccain (Church of Brecan), commonly called the Seven Churches of Aran, is a complex of churches and other buildings dedicated to the 5th-century Saint Brecan, once a popular destination for pilgrims. In the centre of the island, at its highest point is the Inishmore Lighthouse, it was decommissioned in 1857 and replaced by the lights at Eeragh and Inisheer.

The island plays host to Ted Fest each year. Established in 2004, it is a celebration of the sitcom Father Ted. Festival goers dress as their favourite characters, watch their favourite episodes and take part in various Ted related events and competitions.

Sport
Some of the limestone sea cliffs have attracted interest from rock-climbers.
Diving is possible. A particularly popular location for this is Poll na bPéist (hole of worms/sea monsters), located at the southern coast of the island, which is a large naturally formed rectangular pool communicating via underground channels with the sea. Since 2012, Inis Mór has hosted an event as part of the Red Bull Cliff Diving World Series.

Transport
The island is serviced by Aran Ferries ferry from Rossaveal and Doolin. These are passenger-only ferries; cars and heavy goods are transported on unscheduled services.

Aer Arann Islands runs daily scheduled flights from Inis Mór Aerodrome to Connemara Airport using Britten Norman Islander aircraft.

In popular culture
The island features heavily in Martin McDonagh's play The Lieutenant of Inishmore. McDonagh would also use Inishmore as a filming location for his film The Banshees of Inisherin.

Inis Mór was used as a recording location for the 1997 film The Matchmaker and the 2010 film Leap Year.

The first story in These Precious Hours by Michael Corrigan has a scene set on Inis Mór.

The island appeared on the premiere episode of The Amazing Race 12 with teams needing to find Teampall Bheanáin after they arrived.

The music video for Dermot Kennedy's "For Island Fires and Family" (video released 10 January 2019) was filmed entirely on Inis Mór.

Notable inhabitants 

 Ceannanach, early Irish missionary, fl. c. 490–500?
 Saint Fanchea, abbess of Killeaney, fl. 500
 Enda of Aran, early Christian missionary, died c. 530
 Mahon mac Turlough Mantach Ó Briain, Chief of Inis Mór, died 1565
 Murrough mac Toirdelbach Ó Briain, Chief of Inis Mór, fl. 1575–1588
 Murrough na dTuadh Ó Flaithbheartaigh, Chief of Iar Connacht, fl. 1569–1593
 Liam O'Flaherty, novelist and short story writer, 28 August 1896 – 7 September 1984
 Bridget Dirrane, centenarian, died 2004
 Pat Mullen, actor and writer, bef.1901- a.1976
 Máirtín Ó Direáin, Irish language poet, 1910–1988
 Breandán Ó hEithir, writer and broadcaster, 1930–1990
 Tim Robinson, author, born 1935
 Maura Derrane, RTÉ television presenter, born 1970
 Barbara Feeney (née Curran), mother of director John Ford (né John Feeney) was born in the town of Kilronan

Aran in the Irish annals

Annals of Inisfallen (AI)

 530  – "Enda of Aran, died."
 654  – "St Nem Moccu Birn, successor of Enne, of Ara, died on the 14th of June."
 751  – "Repose of Colmán mac Comán, in Ára."
 755  – "Gaimdibhla, Abbot of Aran, died."
 916  – "Egnech, successor of Enda of Ara, bishop and anchorite, died."
 1110 – "Flann Ua Aedha, successor of Énna of Ára, died."
 1114 – "Maelcoluim Ua Cormacain, successor of Ende of Ara, died."
 "AI1015.8 The foreigners of the Isles, viz. with the complement of seven ships, raided the Islands, and they plundered Ara, Inse Mod, and Inis Aingin(?), and carried off one hundred and fifty [captives] as booty."
 "AI1016.6 The slaughter of Ára, in which Ua Lochlainn, royal heir of Corcu Modruad, was killed in Port Ciaráin in Ára. It was the Conmaicne who slew him."
 "AI1019.4 A great pestilence, i.e. a colic, in Ára in the above year, and many people died there."
 1167 – Gillagori Ua Dubhacan "successor of Einde of Ara, died."

Demographics 
The table below reports data on Inis Mór's population taken from Discover the Islands of Ireland (Alex Ritsema, Collins Press, 1999) and the census of Ireland.

Annalistic references
AI=Annals of Inisfallen. (AF)M=Annals of the Four Masters.

 AI1016.6 "The slaughter of Ára, in which Ua Lochlainn, royal heir of Corcu Modruad, was killed in Port Ciaráin in Ára. It was the Conmaicne who slew him. Death of Muiredach son of Cadla, king of Conmaicne Mara."
 AI1019.4 "A great pestilence, i.e. a colic, in Ára in the above year, and many people died there."
 M1186 "Conchubhar Ua Flaithbertaigh was killed by Ruaidhri Ua Flaithbertaigh, by his own brother, in Ara."
 M1560.8 "Mahon, the son of Turlough, son of Teige, son of Donough, son of Donnell, son of Turlough Meith O'Brien, went into Desmond with the crew of a ship and boat, from the island of Aran. He took prisoners in the southern country, but some assert that the taking of them was of no advantage, and that they only accompanied him through friendship. On his return with his spoils, the wind became rough, and the sky angry; and the ship and boat were separated from each other; and when the ship was making for Aran in the beginning of the night, the sail was swept away from the hands of the men and warriors, and torn to rags off the ropes and tackles, and wafted into the regions of the firmament; and the ship afterwards struck upon a rock, which is at the mouth of Cuan-an-fhir-mhoir, in West Connaught, where she was lost, with her crew, except Mahon and three others. Upwards of one hundred were drowned in that harbour, among whom was Tuathal O'Malley, the best pilot of a fleet of long ships in his time."
 M1565.3 "Mahon, the son of Turlough Mantagh, son of Donough, son of Donnell, son of Turlough Meith, was treacherously slain in his own town of Aircin, in Aran, by his own associates and relations. When the chief men of Galway heard of this, they set out to revenge this misdeed upon the treacherous perpetrators, so that they compelled them to fly from their houses; and they the fugitives went into a boat, and put to sea; and where they landed was in the harbour of Ross, in West Corca-Bhaiscinn. Donnell, the son of Conor O'Brien, having heard of this, he hastened to meet them with all the speed that he could exert; and he made prisoners of the greater number of them, and carried them in close fetters to Magh Glae, in the upper part of Corcomroe, in order that their sorrow and anguish might be the greater for being in view of the place where they had perpetrated the crime; he hanged some of them, and burned others, according as their evil practices deserved."

References

External links

Gaeltacht places in County Galway
Aran Islands